King Gong may refer to:

King Gong of Zhou (reigned 922–900 BC), king of the Zhou Dynasty
King Gong of Chu (r. 590–560 BC), king of the state of Chu

See also
 Prince Gong (disambiguation), whose title is also translated as king